During the 1957–58 English football season, Brentford competed in the Football League Third Division South. The Bees finished as runners-up to Brighton & Hove Albion and narrowly missed out on promotion to the Second Division.

Season summary 
After the departure of Bill Dodgin Sr, Brentford recruited Kilmarnock manager Malky MacDonald for their vacant managerial position in May 1957. MacDonald was no stranger to Griffin Park, having spent just under three years as a player-coach with the Bees between 1946 and 1949. First on MacDonald's list of priorities was to ensure that Brentford finished in the top half of the Third Division South table, to avoid becoming founder members of the new Fourth Division in the following season. Ageing and injury-ravaged players Sid Tickridge, Wally Bragg and Frank Dudley were released, while Jeff Taylor, the club's second-leading scorer in each of the previous two seasons, elected to retire and pursue a career in opera. MacDonald recruited former Brentford player Fred Monk as trainer and made just one signing of note, full back Tom Wilson from Fulham, whom he named captain. Ken Horne, Ian Dargie and Johnny Rainford (three players who had seen their playing time reduced under previous manager Dodgin) would be regulars again under MacDonald during the season.

After a mixed start to the season, an unbeaten run of six wins in eight matches in October and November elevated Brentford to 2nd place on 23 November 1957. The run included a new club record of seven consecutive clean sheets. Forwards Jim Towers and George Francis were in prolific form and had scored 24 of the Bees' 37 league goals at that point of the season. After a dip around the turn of the year, Brentford clawed their way back to the higher reaches of the Third Division South table and won six matches in a row in March and early April to move up to 4th. A 1–0 defeat to Torquay United on 7 April put Brentford four points behind leaders Brighton & Hove Albion, with the Bees having played one game more. The damage of draws in the following two matches (versus Southampton and a showdown with Brighton & Hove Albion) was lessened by fellow challengers Plymouth Argyle, Swindon Town and Reading all dropping points.

The Bees, spurred on by six goals from Jim Towers, won their final three matches of the season versus Reading, Port Vale and leaders Brighton & Hove Albion. The victory over Brighton put Brentford top on 58 points, ahead of Plymouth Argyle and Brighton on goal average. Brighton could still win the title by virtue of their game in hand, which would come versus Watford two days later, whom they had beaten 1–0 at Vicarage Road two days before their match at Griffin Park. Brighton emphatically beat Watford 6–0 in their final match to win promotion to the Second Division, but the manner of their victories over Watford raised concern and the referee of the first meeting between the clubs wrote to the Football League outlining his suspicions. It wasn't until October 1960 that former Brighton & Hove Albion wing half Glen Wilson revealed to the Daily Mail that some of the Watford players had agreed to "lie down" in exchange for money. Looking back in 2010, Brentford full back Ken Horne summarised the situation:

League table

Results
Brentford's goal tally listed first.

Legend

Football League Third Division South

FA Cup

 Sources: 100 Years Of Brentford, Statto, 11v11

Playing squad 
Players' ages are as of the opening day of the 1957–58 season.

 Sources: 100 Years Of Brentford, Timeless Bees

Coaching staff

Statistics

Appearances and goals

Players listed in italics left the club mid-season.
Source: 100 Years Of Brentford

Goalscorers 

Players listed in italics left the club mid-season.
Source: 100 Years Of Brentford

Management

Summary

Transfers & loans

References 

Brentford F.C. seasons
Brentford